Events in the year 2013 in Liechtenstein.

Incumbents 
 Prince: Hans-Adam II
 Regent: Alois
 Prime Minister: Klaus Tschütscher (until 27 March), Adrian Hasler (since 27 March)

Events 

 3 February – The 2013 Liechtenstein general election take place, resulting with the Patriotic Union (VU) suffering a large defeat, losing more than a third of its seats, while the Progressive Citizens' Party lost one seat in the landtag.

Deaths 
 Markus Büchel, 54, Liechtenstein politician, Prime Minister (1993).

See also 

 2013 in Europe
 City states

References 

 
2010s in Liechtenstein
Years of the 21st century in Liechtenstein
Liechtenstein
Liechtenstein